Life with Blondie is a 1945 black-and-white domestic comedy film and the 16th of the 28 Blondie films. It was the return of Dagwood and Blondie after Columbia Picture's 1943 decision to cancel the series met with protest.

Plot summary
A photograph of the Bumstead's dog, Daisy, is unexpectedly chosen by servicemen as their favorite pinup model, instead of a girl's picture.   Numerous photographers then clamor to use Daisy on magazine covers and in advertising campaigns.  Excited neighbors of the Bumsteads line up to get Daisy's "paw print."  Daisy earns more money than Dagwood, and monopolizes most of Blondie's time and attention.  Dagwood and the children feel neglected and overlooked.  Mr. Dithers is irritated when Dagwood takes short breaks from his work to mind the children while Blondie is gone.  At one point, baby Cookie crawls out onto a towering, precarious window ledge at Dagwood's office.  Later, Daisy's photographer, after having a male model cancel, asks a reluctant Dagwood to substitute and model bathing suits with a group of flirtatious bathing beauties, which angers Blondie (as well as making Dagwood late returning to his office).  Dagwood turns down representatives of a gangster who come to the house wanting to buy Daisy, and then return later to kidnap the dog, making Dagwood fight them.

Cast
 Penny Singleton as Blondie
 Arthur Lake as Dagwood
 Larry Simms as Baby Dumpling
Marjorie Ann Mutchie as Cookie
 Daisy as Daisy the Dog
 Jonathan Hale as J.C. Dithers
 Ernest Truex as Theodore Glassby
 Marc Lawrence as Pete
 Veda Ann Borg as Hazel
 Ray Walker as Anthony
 Jack Rice as Ollie Shaw
 Lester Dorr as John

References

External links
 
 
 
 

1945 films
Columbia Pictures films
American black-and-white films
Blondie (film series) films
1945 comedy films
American comedy films
Films directed by Abby Berlin
1940s American films